This is a list of films produced in the Republican period of China ordered by year of release in the 1930s.

For an alphabetical listing of Chinese films see :Category:Chinese films.

1930

1931

1932

1933

1934

1935

1936

1937

1938

1939

Mainland Chinese Film Production Totals

See also
Cinema of China
Best 100 Chinese Motion Pictures as chosen by the 24th Hong Kong Film Awards

Sources
中国影片大典 Encyclopaedia of Chinese Films. 1905-1930, 故事片·戏曲片. (1996). Zhong guo ying pian da dian: 1905-1930. Beijing: 中国电影出版社 China Movie Publishing House. 
中国影片大典 Encyclopaedia of Chinese Films. 1931-1949.9, 故事片·戏曲片. (2005). Zhong guo ying pian da dian: 1931-1949.9. Beijing: 中国电影出版社 China Movie Publishing House.

References

External links
 Chinese Film Classics project website - a non-profit academic website of the University of British Columbia featuring free English translations of over 25 early Chinese films
 Modern Chinese Cultural Studies YouTube channel (access via Chinese Film Classics website) - hosts many early Chinese films with English subtitles, and hundreds of film clips
IMDb list of Chinese films

1930s
Films
China